The 96th Sustainment Brigade, is a combat service support formation of the United States Army Reserve. It traces its history to the 96th Infantry Division which served in the Asia-Pacific theater during World War II. Effective 17 September 2008, the unit became the 96th Sustainment Brigade, with its headquarters located at Fort Douglas, Salt Lake City, Utah.

World War I
The division was first organized on 20 October 1918, during the U.S. mobilization for World War I. Based at Camp Wadsworth, South Carolina, the 96th was commanded by Guy Carleton; it was one of the last divisions activated, and the war ended before it could be sent overseas, so it was demobilized on 7 January 1919.  The 191st and 192nd Brigades comprised the infantry elements of the division.

Interwar period
The 96th Division was reconstituted in the United States Army Reserve, then called the Organized Reserve, on 24 June 1921. It was allotted to the states of Oregon and Washington. The headquarters was organized in December 1921.

World War II
The 96th Division was ordered into active service on 15 August 1942, eight months after the Attack on Pearl Harbor brought the United States into World War II.

Ordered into active service: 15 August 1942, Camp Adair, Oregon.
Overseas: 23 July 1944.
Campaigns: Leyte, Ryukyus
Days of Combat: 200
Entered Combat: 20 October 1944 (Leyte)
Killed In Action: 1,563
Total Casualties: 8,812
Presidential Unit Citation: 1.
Awards: MH-5; DSC-12; DSM-1; SS-232; LM-4; SM-73; BSM-4,588; AM-84.
Commanders: Maj. Gen. James L. Bradley commanded the division throughout its entire life in World War II.
Assistant Division Commanders: Brig. Gen. Claudius M. Easley (August 1942 – June 1945, KIA); Brig. Gen. Dennis E. McCunniff (December 1945 – February 1946)
Commanding Officer Artillery: Brig Gen. Paul V. Kane (July 1942 – April 1944); Brig Gen. Robert G. Gard (May 1944 – December 1945)
Chief of Staff: Colonel Hammond M. Monroe (May 1942 – May 1944)
Returned to U.S.: 2 February 1946.
Inactivated: 3 February 1946, at Camp Anza, California.

Medal of Honor recipients
Beauford T. Anderson, Technical sergeant – 381st Infantry Regiment (Battle of Okinawa)
Clarence B. Craft, Private first class – 382nd Infantry Regiment (Battle of Okinawa)
Ova A. Kelley, Private – 382nd Infantry Regiment, KIA (Battle of Leyte)
Edward J. Moskala, Private first class – 383rd Infantry Regiment, KIA (Battle of Okinawa)
Seymour W. Terry, Captain – 382nd Infantry Regiment, KIA (Battle of Okinawa)

Composition

Headquarters, 96th Infantry Division
381st Infantry Regiment
382d Infantry Regiment
383rd Infantry Regiment 
 Headquarters and Headquarters Battery, 96th Infantry Division Artillery
361st Field Artillery Battalion
362d Field Artillery Battalion
363d Field Artillery Battalion
921st Field Artillery Battalion
321st Engineer Combat Battalion
321st Medical Battalion
96th Cavalry Reconnaissance Troop (Mechanized)
 Headquarters, Special Troops, 96th Infantry Division
 Headquarters Company, 96th Infantry Division
796th Ordnance Light Maintenance Company
96th Quartermaster Company
96th Signal Company
Military Police Platoon
Band
96th Counterintelligence Corps Detachment

World War II combat chronicle

As part of the reorganization of the U.S. Army divisions from "square" to "triangular," the two infantry brigade headquarters were converted to provide personnel for other units, and the 380th Infantry Regiment was disbanded. The 192nd Infantry Brigade headquarters company was converted into the division's 96th Reconnaissance Troop, while the 191st Infantry Brigade headquarters formed the core of the division's headquarters company. After initial training at Camp White in southern Oregon, the 96th Infantry Division participation in the Oregon Maneuver combat exercise in the fall of 1943.

Major General James L. Bradley commanded the 96th Infantry Division throughout its entire life in World War II. His assistant division commander, Brigadier General (later Major General) Claudius M. Easley, who would later be killed in action on Okinawa on 19 June 1945, personally supervised and emphasized the 96th Division's marksmanship training, leading to the 96th's nickname of "Deadeye Division". 

The 96th Infantry Division trained in the Hawaiian Islands from July to September 1944, before entering combat in an assault landing in Leyte Gulf, Philippine Islands, between Tanauan and Dulag on 20 October 1944. Enemy resistance in the beachhead area was quickly broken and the Division had advanced to and secured the Tanauan-Dagami-Tabontabon sector by 9 November after heavy fighting. The Division continued to wipe out resistance on the island, engaging in small unit actions, patrolling, probing, and wiping out pockets of Japanese. Chalk Ridge was taken, 12 December 1944, and major organized resistance was at an end by Christmas Day. The next 3 months were spent in mopping up, security duty, training, and loading for the coming invasion of Okinawa.

The Division left the Philippines, 27 March 1945, for Okinawa, making an assault landing on the island, 1 April 1945. The landing was unopposed and a beachhead was established near Sunabe, 1–3 April. Resistance stiffened considerably as the Division advanced to Kakazu Ridge, where fighting was fierce, 7–16 April. The 96th assaulted and cracked the fanatically defended enemy defense line, Tanabaru-Nishibaru, 17–23 April, and after advancing slightly against extremely determined resistance, was relieved on 30 April by the 77th Infantry Division. The Division trained and rested, 1–9 May, while elements mopped up bypassed enemy pockets and then returned to the offensive, 10 May, attacking and capturing Conical-Sugar Hill Ridge on 21 May, thus breaking the right flank of the Shuri defenses. Heavy rains the following week slowed down the advance. The offensive was resumed, 30 May, against weakening enemy resistance; Japanese north of Yonabaru-Shuri-Naha Road area were cleared out. Resistance stiffened again, 3 June, and Laura Hill was taken, 14 June 1945, only after a bloody fight; the last important Japanese defense position, the Yuza-Dake, Yaeju-Dake Hill mass, was secured by 17 June, and on 22 June all resistance was declared at an end. The Division patrolled an area from Chan to Ogusuku until 30 June.

After resting in July, the Division left Okinawa for Mindoro, in the Philippines, and engaged in a training program. The Division left the Philippines, 17 January 1946, for the United States.

Postwar 
The division commenced its Army Reserve role in December 1946, commanded by Colonel Ross J. Wilson of Kalispell, Montana. The division headquarters was Fort Missoula, Montana. Major units were located at Great Falls, Montana, Phoenix, Arizona, and Salt Lake City. The division appears to have kept the 381st, 382nd, and 383rd Infantry Regiments. In August 1948, Colonel LeRoy H. Anderson of Conrad, Montana was appointed as the Commander. The headquarters moved to Helena, Montana, and then transferred to Fort Douglas, Utah in 1962. Major General Michael B. Kauffman was named commander, followed by Brigadier General Ray D. Free. The division was inactivated in December 1965, although some elements of the division remained active within the newly activated 191st Infantry Brigade.

On 22 December 1967, the Department of the Army announced that Salt Lake City, Utah had been chosen as the site for one of the eighteen new nationwide Army Reserve Command (ARCOM) headquarters. The ARCOM would command all Army Reserve units in Utah, Idaho and Montana. In March 1968, the number "96" was assigned to the command. The Department of the Army allowed ARCOMs to wear the shoulder sleeve insignia and numerical designation of previously active infantry divisions but did not convey upon ARCOMs the lineages of those divisions, as it is against Army policy for TDA units, such as ARCOMs, to perpetuate the lineages of TO&E units, such as divisions. Also in March the 259th Quartermaster Battalion, an ARCOM unit in Pleasant Grove, Utah was ordered to active duty. In September, the 259th transferred overseas for duty in Vietnam and served with distinction, being awarded the Meritorious Unit Commendation. It was released from active duty on 18 September 1969. Sterling R. Ryser succeeded Major General Free as ARCOM commander in early 1969. In 1971 with the merger of the Fourth and Fifth Army areas, the 96th ARCOM's span of command was increased to include North Dakota, South Dakota, Wyoming, and Colorado. In 1973 the command was again reorganized, gaining the state of New Mexico and losing North and South Dakota.

Since 1974, 96th ARCOM units have trained with their regular Army counterparts throughout the United States, Europe, and Asia. Franklin McKean was appointed Commanding General in 1975, followed by Larry Morris in 1979. In 1984, the ARCOM was again reorganized, losing New Mexico and regaining North and South Dakota. Richard O. Christiansen was appointed as Commanding General. In 1985, the 96th ARCOM was geographically the largest Army Reserve Command in the United States. The ARCOM consisted of 94 units and 9,320 reservists, augmented by 243 full-time soldiers and 288 civilian employees. On 9 April 1989 Donald M. Bagley was appointed Commanding General.

In 1991, 3rd Battalion, 87th Infantry Regiment, located in Colorado, was mobilized for security duties in Germany during the Gulf War. In 1993 MG Richard F. Reeder assumed command of the 96th ARCOM.  In 1996, as part of the US Army Reserve Command restructuring, the 96th ARCOM became the 96th Regional Support Command.  After the end of the Cold War, the command was finally redesignated the 96th Regional Readiness Command. Subordinate units of the 96th RRC have been deployed to Iraq, Afghanistan, and Djibouti in support of the Global War on Terror from 2001. Units have also been deployed to Bosnia and Herzegovina and Kosovo as part of peacekeeping operations in the Balkans.

Effective 17 September 2008, the 96th Regional Readiness Command was reorganized and redesignated as the 96th Sustainment Brigade, with its headquarters located at Fort Douglas, Salt Lake City, Utah.  The 96th Sustainment Brigade deployed for Operation Iraqi Freedom in 2009. The brigade returned to the United States in May 2010.

In 2015, members of the headquarters element mobilized in support of Operation Inherent Resolve fighting Daesh in Iraq and Syria, providing support to Special Operations Command Central, and returned to the U.S. in April 2016.

References

Further reading
Deadeyes, The Story of the 96th Infantry Division; by Capt. John C. Willems, Capt. Orlando R. Davidson, and Tee. 4 Joseph A. Kahl, unit historians;
The Infantry Journal, Washington 6, D. C.; 1947.

External links
 The Army Almanac: A Book of Facts Concerning the Army of the United States U.S. Government Printing Office, 1950
 United States Army Center of Military History, Components of Infantry Divisions in World War 2
 96th Infantry Division Deadeye Association Association for veterans, families, and supporters of the 96th Infantry Division, 96th Regional Readiness Command, and 96th Sustainment Brigade

Sustainment Brigades of the United States Army